Milan Cathedral, or Metropolitan Cathedral-Basilica of the Nativity of Saint Mary, is the cathedral church of Milan, Lombardy, Italy. Dedicated to the Nativity of St. Mary (Santa Maria Nascente), it is the seat of the Archbishop of Milan, currently Archbishop Mario Delpini.

The cathedral took nearly six centuries to complete: construction began in 1386, and the final details were completed in 1965. It is the largest church in the Italian Republic—the larger St. Peter's Basilica is in the State of Vatican City, a sovereign state—and one of the largest in the world.

History

Milan's layout, with streets either radiating from the Duomo or circling it, reveals that the Duomo occupies what was the most central site in Roman Mediolanum, that of the public basilica facing the forum. The first cathedral, the "new basilica" dedicated to St Thecla, was completed by 355. It seems to share, on a slightly smaller scale, the plan of the contemporaneous church recently rediscovered beneath Tower Hill in London. An adjoining basilica was erected in 836. The old octagonal baptistery, the Battistero Paleocristiano, dates to 335 and still can be visited under the cathedral. When a fire damaged the cathedral and basilica in 1075, they were rebuilt as the Duomo.

Construction begins
In 1386, Archbishop Antonio da Saluzzo began construction of the cathedral. Start of the construction coincided with the ascension to power in Milan of the archbishop's cousin Gian Galeazzo Visconti, and was meant as a reward to the noble and working classes, who had suffered under his tyrannical Visconti predecessor Barnabò. The construction of the cathedral was also dictated by very specific political choices: with the new construction site the population of Milan intended to emphasize the centrality of Milan in the eyes of Gian Galeazzo, a prominence questioned by the choice of the new lord to reside and maintain his court, like his father Galeazzo II, in Pavia and not in Milan. Before actual work began, three main buildings were demolished: the palace of the Archbishop, the Ordinari Palace and the Baptistry of St. Stephen at the Spring, while the old church of Sta. Maria Maggiore was exploited as a stone quarry. Enthusiasm for the immense new building soon spread among the population, and the shrewd Gian Galeazzo, together with his cousin the archbishop, collected large donations for the work-in-progress. The construction program was strictly regulated under the "Fabbrica del Duomo", which had 300 employees led by first chief engineer Simone da Orsenigo. Orsenigo initially planned to build the cathedral from brick in Lombard Gothic style.

Visconti had ambitions to follow the newest trends in European architecture. In 1389, a French chief engineer, Nicolas de Bonaventure, was appointed, adding to the church its Rayonnant Gothic. Galeazzo gave the Fabbrica del Duomo exclusive use of the marble from the Candoglia quarry and exempted it from taxes. Ten years later another French architect, Jean Mignot, was called from Paris to judge and improve upon the work done, as the masons needed new technical aid to lift stones to an unprecedented height. Mignot declared all the work done up until then as in pericolo di ruina ("peril of ruin"), as it had been done sine scienzia ("without science"). In the following years, Mignot's forecasts proved untrue, but they spurred Galeazzo's engineers to improve their instruments and techniques. However, relations between Gian Galeazzo and the top management of the factory (chosen by the citizens of Milan) were often tense: the lord (who in 1395 had become Duke of Milan) intended to transform the cathedral into the dynastic mausoleum of the Visconti, inserting the central part of the cathedral funeral monument of his father Galeazzo II and this met with strong opposition from both the factory and the Milanese, who wanted to underline their autonomy. A clash arose, which forced Gian Galeazzo to decide on the foundation of a new construction site intended exclusively for the Visconti dynasty: the Certosa di Pavia. Work proceeded quickly, and at the death of Gian Galeazzo in 1402, almost half the cathedral was complete. Construction, however, stalled almost totally until 1480, for lack of money and ideas: the most notable works of this period were the tombs of Marco Carelli and Pope Martin V (1424) and the windows of the apse (1470s), of which those extant portray St. John the Evangelist, by Cristoforo de' Mottis, and Saint Eligius and San John of Damascus, both by Niccolò da Varallo. In 1452, under Francesco Sforza, the nave and the aisles were completed up to the sixth bay.

In 1488, both Leonardo da Vinci and Donato Bramante created models in a competition to design the central cupola; Leonardo later withdrew his submission. From 1500 to 1510, under Ludovico Sforza, the octagonal cupola was completed, and decorated in the interior with four series of 15 statues each, portraying saints, prophets, sibyls and other Figures from the Bible. The exterior long remained without any decoration, except for the Guglietto dell'Amadeo ("Amadeo's Little Spire"), constructed 1507–1510. This is a Renaissance masterwork which nevertheless harmonized well with the general Gothic appearance of the church.

During the subsequent Spanish domination, the new church proved usable, even though the interior remained largely unfinished, and some bays of the nave and the transepts were still missing. In 1552 Giacomo Antegnati was commissioned to build a large organ for the north side of the choir, and Giuseppe Meda provided four of the sixteen reliefs which were to decorate the altar area (the program was completed by Federico Borromeo). In 1562, Marco d'Agrate's St. Bartholomew and the famous Trivulzio candelabrum (12th century) were added.

Borromeo

After the accession of Carlo Borromeo to the archbishop's throne, all lay monuments were removed from the Duomo. These included the tombs of Giovanni, and Filippo Maria Visconti, Francesco I and his wife Bianca, Galeazzo Maria, which were brought to unknown destinations. However, Borromeo's main intervention was the appointment, in 1571, of Pellegrino Pellegrini as chief engineer— a contentious move, since to appoint Pellegrino, who was not a lay brother of the duomo, required a revision of the Fabbrica's statutes.

Borromeo and Pellegrini strove for a new, Renaissance appearance for the cathedral, that would emphasise its Roman / Italian nature, and subdue the Gothic style, which was now seen as foreign. As the façade still was largely incomplete, Pellegrini designed a "Roman" style one, with columns, obelisks and a large tympanum. When Pellegrini's design was revealed, a competition for the design of the façade was announced, and this elicited nearly a dozen entries, including one by Antonio Barca.

This design was never carried out, but the interior decoration continued: in 1575-1585 the presbytery was rebuilt, while new altars and the baptistry were added. The wooden choir stalls were constructed by 1614 for the main altar by Francesco Brambilla. In 1577 Borromeo finally consecrated the whole edifice as a new church, distinct from the old Santa Maria Maggiore and Santa Tecla (which had been unified in 1549 after heavy disputes).

17th century

At the beginning of the 17th century Federico Borromeo had the foundations of the new façade laid by Francesco Maria Richini and Fabio Mangone. Work continued until 1638 with the construction of five portals and two middle windows. In 1649, however, the new chief architect Carlo Buzzi introduced a striking revolution: the façade was to revert to the original Gothic style, including the already finished details within big Gothic pilasters and two giant belfries. Other designs were provided by, among others, Filippo Juvarra (1733) and Luigi Vanvitelli (1745), but all remained unapplied. In 1682 the façade of Santa Maria Maggiore was demolished and the cathedral's roof covering was completed.

In 1762 one of the main features of the cathedral, the Madonnina's spire, was erected at the dizzying height of 108.5 m. The spire was designed by Carlo Pellicani and sports at the top a famous polychrome Madonnina statue, designed by Giuseppe Perego that befits the stature of the cathedral. Given Milan's notoriously damp and foggy climate, the Milanese consider it a fair-weather day when the Madonnina is visible from a distance, as it is so often covered by mist.

Completion

On 20 May 1805, Napoleon Bonaparte, about to be crowned King of Italy, ordered the façade to be finished by Pellicani. In his enthusiasm, he assured that all expenses would fall to the French treasurer, who would reimburse the Fabbrica for the real estate it had to sell. Even though this reimbursement was never paid, it still meant that finally, within only seven years, the cathedral's façade was completed. Pellicani largely followed Buzzi's project, adding some neo-Gothic details to the upper windows. As a form of thanksgiving, a statue of Napoleon was placed at the top of one of the spires. Napoleon was crowned King of Italy at the Duomo.

In the following years, most of the missing arches and spires were constructed. The statues on the southern wall were also finished, while in 1829–1858, new stained glass windows replaced the old ones, though with less aesthetically significant results. The last details of the cathedral were finished only in the 20th century: the last portal was inaugurated on 6 January 1965. This date is considered the very end of a process which had proceeded for generations, although even now, some uncarved blocks remain to be completed as statues. The Allied bombing of Milan in World War II further delayed construction. Like many other cathedrals in cities bombed by the Allied forces, the Duomo suffered some damage, although to a lesser degree compared to other major buildings in the vicinity such as the La Scala Theatre. It was quickly repaired and became a place of solace and gathering for displaced local residents.

The Duomo's main façade went under renovation from 2003 to early 2009: as of February 2009, it has been completely uncovered, showing again the colours of the Candoglia marble.

In November 2012 officials announced a campaign to raise funds for the cathedral's preservation by asking patrons to adopt the building's spires. The effects of pollution on the 14th-century building entail regular maintenance, and recent austerity cuts to Italy's cultural budget have left less money for the upkeep of cultural institutions, including the cathedral. To help make up funds, Duomo management launched a campaign offering its 135 spires up for "adoption". Donors who contribute €100,000 (about $110,505) or more will have a plaque with their name engraved on it placed on the spire.

Architects and engineers

 1387 Simone da Orsenigo
 1387 Zeno da Campione
 1387 Marco da Campione detto da Frixono
 1389 Giacomo da Campione
 1389 Nicola Bonaventura o da Benaventis di Francia
 1389 Stefanino o Tavannino di Castelseprio
 1391 Giovanni Fernach di Frimburgo
 1391 Giovannino de Grassi
 1391 Lorenzo degli Spazii da Campione o di Laino
 1391 Marco da Carona
 1391 Enrico di Gamodia (Gmüden)
 1394 Beltramo da Conigo
 1394 Ulrico Füssingen di Ulma
 1398 Salomone de Grassi
 1399 Antonio o Antonino da Paderno
 1399 Gasparino da Carona
 1399 Giacomolo da Venezia di Parigi
 1399 Giovanni Mignoto
 1399 Giovanni Cona o Cova di Bruges
 1399 Arasmino de Sirtori
 1400 Filippo degli Organi
 1401 Polino da Orsenigo
 1404 Antonio da Paderno
 1406 Cristoforo de Chiona
 1407 Leonardo da Sirtori
 1409 Giovanni Magatto
 1415 Antonio da Muggiò
 1416 Bartolomeo di Modena
 1420 Antonio da Gorgonzola
 1430 Franceschino da Cannobio
 1451 Giorgio degli Organi da Modena
 1451 Giovanni Solari
 1452 Antonio da Firenze detto il Filarete
 1458 Donato de Sirtori
 1459 Boniforte o Guinforte Solari
 1476 Pietro Antonio Solari
 1483 Giovanni Nexemperger di Graz
 1486 Giovanni Antonio Amadeo
 1490 Gian Giacomo Dolcebuono
 1506 Cristoforo Solari detto il Gobbo
 1512 Gerolamo della Porta
 1519 Bernardo Zenale di Treviglio
 1524 Giangiacomo della Porta
 1526 Cristoforo Lombardo
 1539 Baldassarre Vianelli
 1547 Vincenzo da Seregno o Seregni
 1567 Pellegrino Pellegrini, called il Tibaldi
 1587 Martino Bassi
 1591 Lelio Buzzi
 1598 Aurelio Trezzi
 1609 Alessandro Bisnato
 1617 Fabio Mangone
 1617 Giovanni Paolo Bisnato
 1631 Francesco Maria Ricchino
 1638 Carlo Buzzio o Buzzi
 1658 Girolamo Quadrio
 1679 Andrea Biffi
 1686 Giambattista Quadrio
 1723 Antonio Quadrio
 1743 Bartolomeo Bolla o Bolli
 1760 Francesco Croce
 1773 Giulio Galliori
 1795 Felice Soave
 1801 Giovanni Antonio Antolini
 1803 Leopoldo Pollak
 1806 Giuseppe Zanoja
 1806 Giuseppe Pollak
 1806 Carlo Amati
 1813 Pietro Pestagalli
 1854-1860 Office vacant
 1861 Giuseppe Vandoni
 1877 Paolo Cesa-Bianchi
 1904 Gaetano Moretti
 1907 Luca Beltrami
 1912 Adolfo Zacchi
 1963 Antonio Cassi Ramelli
 1964 Carlo Ferrari da Passano
 1988 Benigno Mörlin Visconti Castiglione

Architecture and art

The plan consists of a nave with four side aisles, crossed by a transept and then followed by choir and apse.

The roof is open to tourists (for a fee), which allows many a close-up view of some spectacular sculpture that would otherwise be unappreciated. The roof of the cathedral is renowned for the forest of openwork pinnacles and spires, set upon delicate flying buttresses.

The cathedral's five broad naves, divided by 40 pillars, are reflected in the hierarchic openings of the façade. Even the transepts have aisles. The huge building is of brick construction, faced with marble from the quarries which Gian Galeazzo Visconti donated in perpetuity to the cathedral chapter. Its maintenance and repairs are very complicated.

In 2015, Milan's cathedral developed a new lighting system based on LED lights.

Aesthetic judgements
The cathedral was built over several hundred years in a number of contrasting styles. Reactions to it have ranged from admiration to disfavour. The Guida d’Italia: Milano 1998 (Touring Club Editore, p. 154) points out that the early Romantics tended to praise it in "the first intense enthusiasms for Gothic." As the Gothic Revival brought in a purer taste, condemnation was often equally intense.

John Ruskin commented acidly that the cathedral steals "from every style in the world: and every style spoiled. The cathedral is a mixture of Perpendicular with Flamboyant, the latter being peculiarly barbarous and angular, owing to its being engrafted, not on a pure, but a very early penetrative Gothic … The rest of the architecture among which this curious Flamboyant is set is a Perpendicular with horizontal bars across: and with the most detestable crocketing, utterly vile. Not a ray of invention in a single form… Finally the statues all over are of the worst possible common stonemasons’ yard species, and look pinned on for show. The only redeeming character about the whole being the frequent use of the sharp gable ... which gives lightness, and the crowding of the spiry pinnacles into the sky." (Notebooks[M.6L]). The plastered ceiling painted to imitate elaborate tracery carved in stone particularly aroused his contempt as a "gross degradation".

While appreciating the force of Ruskin's criticisms, Henry James was more appreciative: "A structure not supremely interesting, not logical, not … commandingly beautiful, but grandly curious and superbly rich. … If it had no other distinction it would still have that of impressive, immeasurable achievement … a supreme embodiment of vigorous effort."

Main monuments and sights

The interior of the cathedral includes numerous monuments and artworks. These include:

At the left of the altar is located the most famous statue of all the cathedral, the Saint Bartholomew Flayed (1562), by Marco d'Agrate, the saint shows his flayed skin thrown over his shoulders like a stole.
The Archbishop Alberto da Intimiano's sarcophagus, which is overlooked by a Crucifix in copper laminae (a replica).
The sarcophagi of the archbishops Ottone Visconti and Giovanni Visconti, created by a Campionese master in the 14th century.
The sarcophagus of Marco Carelli, who donated 35,000 ducati to accelerate the construction of the cathedral.
The three magnificent altars by Pellegrino Pellegrini, which include the notable Federico Zuccari's Visit of St. Peter to St. Agatha jailed.
In the right transept, the monument to Gian Giacomo Medici di Marignano, called "Medeghino", by Leone Leoni, and the adjacent Renaissance marble altar, decorated with gilt bronze statues.
The presbytery is a late Renaissance masterpiece composing a choir, a Temple by Pellegrini, two pulpits with giant atlantes covered in copper and bronze, and two large organs. Around the choir, the two sacristies' portals, some frescoes and a fifteenth-century statue of Martin V by Jacopino da Tradate can be seen.
The transepts house the Trivulzio Candelabrum, which is in two pieces. The base (attributed to Nicolas of Verdun, 12th no century), characterized by a fantastic ensemble of vines, vegetables and imaginary animals; and the stem, of the mid-16th century.
In the left aisle, the Arcimboldi monument by Alessi and Romanesque figures depicting the Apostles in red marble and the neo-Classic baptistry by Pellegrini.
A small red light bulb in the dome above the apse marks the spot where one of the nails reputedly from the Crucifixion of Christ has been placed. The Holy Nail is retrieved and exposed to the public every year, during a celebration known as the Rite of the Nivola.
In November–December, in the days surrounding the birthdate of Saint Charles Borromeo, a series of large canvases, the Quadroni are exhibited along the nave.
Since September 2005, in the cathedral's crypt, beside the relics of Saint Charles Borromeo, there has been a video installation by English artist Mark Wallinger. Entitled Via Dolorosa, it consists of an 18-minute film reproducing scenes of the Passion excerpted from the film Jesus of Nazareth by Franco Zeffirelli.
In November 2014 a white marble sculpture by Tony Cragg inspired to the Madonna statue on the rooftop was installed.
The 5-manual, 225-rank pipe organ, built jointly by the Tamburini and Mascioni Italian organ building firms on Mussolini's command, is currently the largest organ in all of Italy.

The American writer and journalist Mark Twain visited Milan in the summer of 1867. He dedicated chapter 18 of Innocents Abroad to Milan Cathedral, including many physical and historical details, and a visit to the roof. He describes the Duomo as follows:

Oscar Wilde visited Milan in June 1875. In a letter to his mother, he wrote: "The Cathedral is an awful failure. Outside the design is monstrous and inartistic. The over-elaborated details stuck high up where no one can see them; everything is vile in it; it is, however, imposing and gigantic as a failure, through its great size and elaborate execution."

In Italian Hours, Henry James describes:  a certain exhibition that I privately enjoyed of the relics of St. Charles Borromeus. This holy man lies at his eternal rest in a small but gorgeous sepulchral chapel … and for the modest sum of five francs you may have his shrivelled mortality unveiled and gaze at it with whatever reserves occur to you. The Catholic Church never renounces a chance of the sublime for fear of a chance of the ridiculous--especially when the chance of the sublime may be the very excellent chance of five francs. The performance in question, of which the good San Carlo paid in the first instance the cost, was impressive certainly, but as a monstrous matter or a grim comedy may still be. The little sacristan, having secured his audience, … lighted a couple of extra candles and proceeded to remove from above the altar, by means of a crank, a sort of sliding shutter, just as you may see a shop-boy do of a morning at his master's window. In this case too a large sheet of plate-glass was uncovered, and to form an idea of the étalage you must imagine that a jeweller, for reasons of his own, has struck an unnatural partnership with an undertaker. The black mummified corpse of the saint is stretched out in a glass coffin, clad in his mouldering canonicals, mitred, crosiered and gloved, glittering with votive jewels. It is an extraordinary mixture of death and life; the desiccated clay, the ashen rags, the hideous little black mask and skull, and the living, glowing, twinkling splendour of diamonds, emeralds and sapphires. The collection is really fine, and many great historic names are attached to the different offerings. Whatever may be the better opinion as to the future of the Church, I can't help thinking she will make a figure in the world so long as she retains this great fund of precious "properties," this prodigious capital decoratively invested and scintillating throughout Christendom at effectively-scattered points.

Astronomical observations
From 1 December 1786, the Austrian Empire adopted “transalpine time”. The astronomers at Brera Astronomical Observatory were engaged by Count Giuseppe Di Wilczek, the plenipotentiary governor of Lombardy, to build a meridian line inside the Duomo. The meridian was constructed by Giovanni Angelo Cesaris and Francesco Reggio, with Roger Boscovich acting as a consultant.

The meridian line was laid on the floor of the Duomo at the west end so as to be accessible and not interfere with religious services. As the beam of light crossed the brass line and indicated solar noon, a signal was given towards the tower of the Palazzo dei Giureconsulti. A person there alerted Sforzesco Castle and a cannon was fired to announce solar noon to the city. This signal was then used to set all of the city clocks to the same time.

The line was examined in 1976 by the architects of the Duomo and astronomers from Brera.

See also
 Anor Londo (Dark Souls)
 Early Christian churches in Milan
 History of early modern period domes
 History of Italian Renaissance domes
 History of medieval Arabic and Western European domes
 Italian Gothic architecture
 Mailänder Dom (Fassade), Mailand
 List of Gothic Cathedrals in Europe
 List of largest church buildings in the world
 List of highest church naves

References

External links
 
 
 Photos and details
 Duomo in Google Maps
 Virtual model of Piazza del Duomo
 Interactive Panorama: Milan Cathedral (roof)
 Corpus of architectural drawings of the Cathedral of Milan research project by the Polytechnic University of Milan

Duomo
Milan
Milano
Cathedrals in Lombardy
Tourist attractions in Milan
Burial sites of the House of Visconti